Kurmalar is a village in the Ilgaz District of Çankırı Province in Turkey. Its population is 46 (2021).

References

Villages in Ilgaz District